Melchor Cob Castro (born 18 April 1968 in Chiná, Campeche, Mexico) is a Mexican former professional boxer in the light flyweight (108 lb) division.

Pro career 
Cob Castro turned pro in 1986 and captured the WBC light flyweight title in 1991 with a TKO win over Rolando Pascua.  He lost the belt in his first defense to Humberto González later that year by decision.  In 1992 he lost a rematch to Gonzalez, also by decision.  In 1997 he captured the WBO light flyweight title with a decision win over Jesus Chong, but again lost the belt in his first defense to Juan Domingo Córdoba.

In 2004 he took on Jorge Arce for the WBC light flyweight title, and was knocked out for the first time in his career in the 5th round.

See also 
List of Mexican boxing world champions
List of light-flyweight boxing champions

External links 
 

1968 births
Living people
Boxers from Campeche
Light-flyweight boxers
World light-flyweight boxing champions
World Boxing Council champions
World Boxing Organization champions
Mexican male boxers